Daejeon Station is on South Korea's high-speed KTX railway network, 166.6 km south of Seoul Station.

History
The station opened on January 1, 1905, in the period of Korea under Japanese rule and KTX trains on the Gyeongbu Line began services on April 1, 2004. The station inspired the romantic blues ballad "Daejeon Blues" that has been preferred by musicians throughout Asia and has become a Korean classic. The melody of the song is played on the speakers of the subway trains upon arriving at Daejeon Station. The station was used for the 2016 film Train to Busan.

Services
Daejeon Station serves all KTX trains on the Gyeongbu Line. It also has express services and local services on the normal speed Gyeongbu Line.  The station is served by the Daejeon Line, a short line connecting Daejeon Station with Seodaejeon station, and also by the Daejeon Subway. Underground shopping can be found connected to Daejeon station.

See also
 Transportation in South Korea
 Korail
 KTX
 KTX-Sancheon

References

External links 

 Korea Train eXpress
 Route Map
 "Daejeon Blues" Song

Korea Train Express stations
Railway stations in Daejeon
Railway stations in Korea opened in 1905
Daejeon Metro stations
Dong District, Daejeon